The Springville Community Presbyterian Church has been an active congregation since the late 1800s. It meets in an historic church building in Springville, Utah, United States, that is listed on the National Register of Historic Places (NRHP) as Springville Presbyterian Church.

Description
The church is located at 245 South 200 East, within the Springville Historic District and is an individually listed contributing property. It was built in 1892 and includes Late Gothic Revival, Modified Late Gothic Revival, and other architecture. It has almost all original stained glass windows and is known for its great acoustics.

The church is currently called the Springville Community Presbyterian Church (2021), part of the PC (USA). The church, and a house right down the street, was featured on the television series Touched by an Angel. As a community church it houses a number of rental groups and is available for short-term rentals (weddings, music recording, reunions, funerals, meetings).

The church was listed on the NRHP in 1980. According to its NRHP nomination, it is significant as the first Protestant church in Springville, for its sponsorship of the Hungerford Academy school, and for representing "the system of over a dozen churches: and more than thirty schools maintained by the Presbyterians at the peak of their activity in Utah."

Visit the website (springvillechurch.org) or the church's Facebook page for current information on the Springville Community Presbyterian Church.

See also

 National Register of Historic Places listings in Utah County, Utah

References

External links

Churches on the National Register of Historic Places in Utah
Carpenter Gothic church buildings in Utah
Churches completed in 1892
Religious buildings and structures in Utah County, Utah
Buildings and structures in Springville, Utah
National Register of Historic Places in Utah County, Utah
Individually listed contributing properties to historic districts on the National Register in Utah